Kevin Anderson was the defending champion, but lost to John Isner in the quarterfinals.

Ernests Gulbis won the title, defeating Édouard Roger-Vasselin 7–6(7–3), 6–3 in the final.

Seeds

Draw

Finals

Top half

Bottom half

Qualifying

Seeds

Qualifiers

Lucky losers
  Ričardas Berankis

Draw

First qualifier

Second qualifier

Third qualifier

Fourth qualifier

References
 Main Draw
 Qualifying Draw

Delray Beach International Tennis Championships - Singles
2013 Singles
2013 Delray Beach International Tennis Championships